Anne Elizabeth Henning (born September 6, 1955) is a retired American speed skater. She grew up in Northbrook, Illinois, and started in short track speed skating, but then, like many short track speed skaters before and after her, switched to long track speed skating. In 1971, 15-year-old Henning won silver at the ISU Sprint Championships, the forerunner of the World Sprint Championships. During those championships, she set new world records in both her 500 m races.

In 1972, Henning broke the world records on the 500 m and the 1,000 m, which made her the favorite on those distances at the 1972 Winter Olympics in Sapporo. During her 500 m race against Sylvia Burka at those Olympics, Henning was obstructed at the crossing by Burka, but she still set the fastest time and a new Olympic record (43.70). In her re-skate, which she was allowed to take according to the rules, she improved her time to 43.33. Aged 16, this made Henning the youngest Olympic Champion in the history of Olympic speed skating. On the 1,000 m, Henning took the bronze medal behind surprise winner Monika Pflug and only 0.01 seconds behind silver medallist Atje Keulen-Deelstra. After that season, a still only 16 year old Henning retired from speed skating.  She said,  “People know about speed skating, that was not part of the game when I won my medals. I wanted to go to college and see what else I could do."

Anne Henning is a retired fourth grade teacher in Aurora, Colorado.  She has 3 grown children and 5 grandchildren. She is married to Erik Palmer and resides in Aurora, Colorado.

World records
Over the course of her career, Henning skated four world records:

Personal records
To put these personal records in perspective, the last column (WR) lists the official world records on the dates that Henning skated her personal records.

References

External links

Anne Henning at SkateResults.com
Personal records from Jakub Majerski's Speedskating Database
https://www.aarp.org/personal-growth/life-stories/info-02-2010/olympic_stars_where.html

1955 births
Living people
Speed skaters at the 1972 Winter Olympics
Olympic gold medalists for the United States in speed skating
Olympic bronze medalists for the United States in speed skating
Sportspeople from Raleigh, North Carolina
World record setters in speed skating
American female speed skaters
Glenbrook North High School alumni
Medalists at the 1972 Winter Olympics
World Sprint Speed Skating Championships medalists